HyperDevbox Japan (previously known as Hyper-Devbox) is a French Japanese video game company created by Carlo Perconti, one of the founders of Toka and Arcade Zone. HyperDevbox Japan is developing original games, mostly for Android, and also porting external titles from one platform to another. The Company is now based exclusively in Tokyo, Japan. HyperDevbox Japan is known for its breaking technology developed for the Android platform with games like ExZeus arcade and the upcoming "Spectral Souls - Resurrection of the Ethereal Empires" (from Idea factory) the first Tactical RPG to be announced for Android devices.

Works
 ExZeus - 2003-2009
 Pocket Pool - (PlayStation Portable), 2004
 Pool Party - (Wii), 2007
 Real SnowGlobe - (iPhone OS app)
 LoveCatch - (iPhone OS app)
 ExZeus 2 - iOS, Android, Windows Phone, Microsoft Windows, 2012
 Indy 500 Arcade Racing - Android, 2014

Porting work
 Octomania - (Wii), 2007
 Record of Agarest War - iOS, Android, 2013

External links
 Company's homepage
 HyperDevbox Japan and Android 
 Hyper-Devbox interview (French only)

Video game companies of Japan
Video game development companies
Software companies based in Tokyo